Christiane Jolissaint (born 12 September 1961) is a former professional tennis player from Switzerland. She won five doubles titles, most often partnering with Marcella Mesker. She reached a highest singles ranking of No. 28 in December 1983 and a highest doubles ranking of No. 26 in May 1988.

WTA Tour finals

Doubles 7 (5–2)

External links
 
 
 

Swiss female tennis players
1961 births
Living people
People from Vevey
Sportspeople from the canton of Vaud